The 1952 United States presidential election in Florida took place on November 4, 1952, as part of the 1952 United States presidential election. Florida voters chose ten representatives, or electors, to the Electoral College, who voted for president and vice president.

Florida was won by Columbia University President Dwight D. Eisenhower (R–Kansas), running with Senator Richard Nixon, with 54.99% of the popular vote, against Adlai Stevenson (D–Illinois), running with Senator John Sparkman, with 44.97% of the popular vote.

In contrast to Herbert Hoover's anti-Catholicism-driven victory in the state in 1928, Eisenhower's victory was entirely concentrated in the newer and more liberal South Florida counties, which had seen extensive Northern settlement since the war, did not have a history of slave-based plantation farming, and saw Eisenhower as more favourable to business than the Democratic Party. Eisenhower swept the urban areas of Miami, Orlando, Fort Lauderdale, Sarasota and Tampa, but failed to gain much support in the northwestern pineywoods that had been the core of the 1928 "Hoovercrat" bolt. In this region – inhabited by socially exceptionally conservative poor whites who had been voting in increasing numbers since Florida abolished its poll tax – Democratic loyalties dating from the Civil War remained extremely strong and economic populism hostile in general toward urban areas kept voters loyal to Stevenson. Whereas the urban voters who turned to Eisenhower felt wholly disfranchised both locally and nationally by the one-party system and malapportionment, rural poor voters supported the New Deal/Fair Deal status quo.

In contrast to the wholly Deep South states of Mississippi, Louisiana and South Carolina, where former Thurmond voters turned to Eisenhower, Florida – although akin to those states in entirely lacking traditional Appalachian, Ozark or German "Forty-Eighter" Republicanism – did not see its 1948 Dixiecrat voters or black belt whites turn over to Eisenhower on a large scale, and they were less loyal than in North Carolina, Texas and Virginia, where traditional Republicanism did exist.

Eisenhower’s victory was the first of three consecutive Republican victories in the state, as Florida would not vote Democratic again until Lyndon B. Johnson’s landslide victory in 1964. , this is the last election in which Collier County voted for a Democratic presidential candidate. This was the first ever occasion that St. Johns County and Hernando County voted Republican.

As of 2023, this is the most recent time that Florida voted to the left of Minnesota.

Results

Results by county

Notes

References 

Florida
1952 Florida elections
United States presidential elections in Florida